The Sisters of Charity of the Blessed Virgin Mary, known by its initials BVM, is a Roman Catholic religious institute founded in the United States by Mother Mary Frances Clarke. Its founders were Irish Catholics. The BVM currently works in twenty-five U.S. states and three foreign countries.

Early history

In 1831, four Franciscan Tertiaries women in Ireland rented a small cottage and began an experiment in community living. Soon, the original four—Mary Frances Clarke, Margaret Mann, Rose O’Toole, and Eliza Kelly—were joined by another, Catherine Byrne. The group made an act of consecration as the Sisters of the Blessed Virgin. In this act, the band of women took one more step in becoming a formal community of women religious sisters within the Roman Catholic tradition. Clarke's background was in accounting. Together, in March 1832, these five opened a school, Miss Clarke’s Seminary, for young girls on North Anne Street in Dublin. In 1833, they met Patrick Costello, a Catholic priest from Philadelphia, who was recovering in Dublin. From him the five learned about the plight of the Irish Catholic immigrants in America. After prayerful consideration and Fr. Costello's agreement to make arrangements for their arrival in the United States, the fellowship of women, except for Rose O'Toole (who remained in Dublin long enough to settle a family estate) decided to leave their homeland to teach in Philadelphia. They arrived in New York in September, 1833.

During the voyage, the women had entrusted their money to Eliza Kelly. As she was climbing down a rope ladder to depart the ship, the purse containing the money accidentally fell into the harbor. In a further setback, the women discovered that Fr. Costello had not prepared for their arrival, and was nowhere to be found. When they finally arrived in Philadelphia, they were taken in by Margaret McDonough, who found them lodging, and directed them to a young priest, Fr. Terence James Donaghoe, who had just been named pastor of the yet-to-be-built parish of St. Michael’s. After meeting the women, Fr. Donaghoe invited them to teach in his parish school, as soon as it was completed. In the interim, the women decided to open a school of their own, which they named Sacred Heart. Fr. Donaghoe drafted a rule for the small community and subsequently became father director, while Mary Frances Clarke was named mother superior.  For the next ten years, the sisters continued to teach as well as gain new members.

Iowa Territory

In 1843, Bishop Mathias Loras of the Diocese of Dubuque, Iowa, who had been visiting Philadelphia, invited the sisters to come teach in the Iowa Territory. So the pioneer BVMs, by then nineteen in number, moved to Dubuque, Iowa, and began to teach the children of settlers, lead miners, and farmers. They opened a new boarding school, St. Mary’s Academy, which was the predecessor of the St. Raphael Cathedral school. They were the first women religious in the territory and would soon open many additional schools.

During their first years in Iowa, the building was used for another school, Sacred Heart. In 1859, the building again saw new life when the St. Joseph Prairie boarding school moved to the site. During these early years, the number of towns at which there were schools continued to grow. An especially important era of growth began in 1867 when Jesuit Priest Arnold Damen invited the sisters to open a school at Holy Family in Chicago.  The Sisters of Charity, BVM opened a number of schools throughout the city, including St. Mary’s and Immaculata High Schools.

In 1885, the Sisters of Charity of the Blessed Virgin Mary, formerly a diocesan community, became a pontifical congregation.

Continued growth

Since the beginning, education had been the dominant charism of the BVM community. This became no less true as the sisterhood continued to grow. Over the next several decades, community leaders directed significant resources on improving the education of the sisters, who were responsible for teaching a large number of students. In the early 1900s, the superior sent teaching sisters to summer school programs at DePaul, Marquette, and the Catholic University of America, as well as to special institutes run at St. Mary’s, one of the community run high schools in Chicago. This ongoing education was especially important for those sisters who taught at Mt. St. Joseph; in 1901 the school received permission to begin granting three-year college degrees.

To honor Mary Frances Clarke, the name of Mt. St. Joseph College was changed to Clarke College in 1928. The following year, construction began for another college, Mundelein College in Chicago. This school remained open until 1991, when it became part of Loyola University. During this time, the community continued to focus on the education of both the students, and the teaching sisters. 

During the later half of the twentieth century, the BVM community continued to grow in both size and number of missions. 1937 saw the opening of a school in Memphis at which the sisters began working directly with the African American community. A few years later, in 1945 a small group of sisters opened a school in Hawaii, and by 1961 there were sisters serving in Latin America. With sisters serving in so many locations, the community developed into a well-networked educational system that spanned the country, from New York to California, and beyond.

Throughout its history, the community has experienced numerous fires. In addition to the 1849 fire at St. Joseph Prairie, there was a 1955 fire at the infirmary at the Dubuque motherhouse, a 1958 fire at Our Lady of the Angels (a BVM grammar school in Chicago), and a 1984 fire at Clarke College.

New era

1961 marked the beginning of a new era in the community and the construction of one of the last remaining BVM high schools. Carmel High School in Mundelein, Illinois was a joint project with the Carmelite Fathers. 

In 1967, the Tenth General Chapter sought to respond to the invitations of the Second Vatican Council. The BVMs responded eagerly to the Second Vatican Council’s call to renewal. Their mission and ministry expanded around the globe and beyond the traditional field of education to include health care, pastoral services, and social justice. Responses which followed included legislation approving a new government structure, the Totally Open Personal Application (TOPA), which gave sisters the freedom to apply for jobs of their choice, and an affiliate program, which consisted of an organized grouping of non-vowed men and women interested in participating in the BVM values.1968 saw the closing of the last boarding school.

The BVM Sisters have not been without controversy. During the 1980s, several sisters underwent "training" for the priesthood and began advocating for the Roman Catholic Church to ordain women, in opposition to centuries of teachings. It is unclear whether there is still BVM support for the change.

In recent years, the community has been actively involved in working for peace with justice. During the Civil Rights Movement, sisters participated in the 1965 Selma to Montgomery marches. There are a number of sisters who participate in the annual demonstration at the School of the Americas/Western Hemisphere Institute for Security Cooperation each year. Sisters of Charity are on the staff of NETWORK and the 8th Day Center for Justice, a coalition of Catholic religious congregations striving for social change. BVM sisters and their associates collaborate with other women religious and advocacy organizations on issues such as immigration reform, human trafficking, opposition to the death penalty, and nonviolence, especially for women and children.  The community has also taken a corporate stance against the death penalty, has declared that the Mount Carmel campus in Dubuque is a nuclear-free zone, and supports national comprehensive immigration reform.

Since its beginning, the community has responded to the current needs of the day. There are sisters living in nineteen states, and in three foreign countries: Ghana, Ecuador, and Guatemala. Ministries of the sisters include working as hospital, hospice, and prison chaplains, working with those with addictions, people with AIDS, pastoral service, spiritual direction, counseling, and education.

November 1, 2007 was a year of jubilee to celebrate the 175th anniversary of the Sisters of Charity of the Blessed Virgin Mary. The theme of the year was “Crossing the Waters, Currents of Hope: Celebrating 175 years of BVM Presence and Partnership”.

Notable members
 Sister Anne Carr - theology professor
 Mother Mary Frances Clarke - founder
 Sister Catherine Dunn - past president of Clarke College
 Judith Ann Mayotte - former member, author, refugee expert
 Mary Kenneth Keller - first person to receive a Ph.D. in computer science
 Sister Jean Dolores Schmidt – chaplain of the Loyola University Chicago men's basketball team; became a media celebrity during the team's 2018 Final Four run.

References

Sources
Harrington, Ann BVM. Creating Community: Mary Frances Clarke and Her Companions. Dubuque, Iowa: Mount Carmel Press, 2004. 
McDonnell, Mary Jane BVM, et al. Clarke Lives. Dubuque, Iowa: Clarke College, 1993.
Sisters of Charity BVM. Salt: Charting BVM History, 1984.
Sisters of Charity BVM. Constitutions. Dubuque, Iowa: Mount Carmel Press, 1989.
Official website (10 November 2007).

External links
 Sisters of Charity of the Blessed Virgin Mary
 Carmel High School in Mundelein
 Clarke College
 Gannon Center for Women and Leadership
 Loyola University Chicago
 Mundelein College
 Sisters of Charity of the Blessed Virgin Mary - Catholic Encyclopedia article

Dubuque, Iowa
Religious organizations established in 1833
Catholic female orders and societies
Catholic teaching orders
Catholic religious institutes established in the 19th century
1833 establishments in the United States
Women in Iowa